Clarendon is a city in, and the county seat of, Monroe County, Arkansas, United States. Located in the Arkansas Delta, the city's position on the White River at the mouth of the Cache River has defined the community since first incorporating in 1859. Although the river has brought devastation and disaster to the city occasionally throughout history, it has also provided economic opportunities, transportation, recreation and tourism to the city.

Once home to a variety of industries, today Clarendon's economy is largely based on agriculture. Similar to many Delta communities, the city's population has been dwindling since mechanization on the farm reduced the number of agricultural-related jobs in the area. At the 2020 census, the population was 1,526, the lowest value recorded since 1890.

History

Settlement through antebellum period
The area around Clarendon was originally populated by various Native American groups. By 1799, French hunters and trappers had built cabins at the mouth of the Cache River. It was the point where the Military Road from Memphis, Tennessee, to Little Rock crossed the White River. The Military Road was begun in 1826 and completed in 1828. By that date, a ferry crossing and post office had been established in Clarendon, and the town served as the terminus for a stagecoach line to the west. The Military Road was used as the route for some groups of Native Americans being relocated from eastern states to Oklahoma during the forced relocations commonly known as the Trail of Tears; Chickasaw, Choctaw, Creek, and Cherokee groups are known to have traveled along it. A railroad bridge across the White River was constructed in 1883 by the Texas and St. Louis Railway; the ferry operated until 1931 when it was replaced by a highway bridge.

Civil War and Reconstruction
The city of Clarendon was officially incorporated in 1859. In 1864, the city was burned to the ground by Union forces in retaliation for the sinking of the tinclad Union gunboat USS Queen City by forces under the command of Confederate Brigadier General Joseph O. Shelby. The town's charter was dissolved in 1884, and it was reincorporated in 1898.

Gilded age through early 20th century

In the early 1900s, Clarendon developed a number of industries, including lumber, staves and barrels, oars, and buttons made from the shells of the area's plentiful freshwater mussels. The mussels also provided freshwater pearls, which were bought and sold at the Clarendon Pearl Market. The Moss Brothers Bat Company supplied baseball bats to a number of major league baseball players during this era.

Like most of eastern Arkansas, Clarendon was devastated by the Great Mississippi Flood of 1927. While no fatalities were reported, the town was inundated by water up to the second floor of many buildings, and the catastrophic inrush of water when the levee broke caused considerable damage to many buildings. The cleanup of mud and debris took many years.

World War II onwards
The area around Clarendon today is primarily agricultural; tourism related to the area's hunting and fishing resources is the most common non-agricultural economic activity. The reported rediscovery of the ivory-billed woodpecker in 2004–2005 in the Cache River and White River National Wildlife Refuges has brought new attention to the area.

Geography
Clarendon is located in western Monroe County at  (34.694035, -91.308411).

Clarendon is located at the mouth of the Cache River, where it empties into the White River.

Climate
According to the Köppen Climate Classification system, Clarendon has a humid subtropical climate, abbreviated "Cfa" on climate maps. The climate in this area is characterized by hot, humid summers and generally mild to cool winters.

Demographics

2020 census

As of the 2020 United States Census, there were 1,526 people, 741 households, and 397 families residing in the city.

2000 census
As of the census of 2000, there were 1,960 people, 814 households, and 520 families residing in the city. The racial makeup of the city was 68.47% White, 30.20% Black or African American, 0.46% Native American, 0.05% Asian, and 0.82% from two or more races. 2.35% of the population were Hispanic or Latino of any race.

There were 814 households, out of which 26.9% had children under the age of 18 living with them, 43.5% were married couples living together, 16.2% had a female householder with no husband present, and 36.1% were non-families. 33.0% of all households were made up of individuals, and 16.7% had someone living alone who was 65 years of age or older. The average household size was 2.38 and the average family size was 3.02.

In the city, the population was spread out, with 26.3% under the age of 18, 8.1% from 18 to 24, 24.1% from 25 to 44, 25.5% from 45 to 64, and 16.1% who were 65 years of age or older. The median age was 38 years. For every 100 females, there were 91.8 males. For every 100 females age 18 and over, there were 86.0 males.

The median income for a household in the city was $22,927, and the median income for a family was $30,250. Males had a median income of $25,972 versus $18,125 for females. The per capita income for the city was $11,902. About 20.8% of families and 28.9% of the population were below the poverty line, including 44.4% of those under age 18 and 26.5% of those age 65 or over.

Economy
The economy of Clarendon is largely defined by the agricultural sector. The city and Clarendon School District are also key employers in the city.

Education 

Public education for elementary and secondary school students is provided by the Clarendon School District, which includes:

 Clarendon Elementary School, serving prekindergarten through grade 6.
 Clarendon High School, serving grades 7 through 12.

Infrastructure

Healthcare
The Mid-Delta Health Center in Clarendon provides medical and dental services to residents in Clarendon and the surrounding area. A total of 3,318 patients utilized the clinic in 2013 according to the Bureau of Primary Health Care.

Transportation

The major highway through Clarendon is U.S. Highway 79, which gives access to Stuttgart to the south, Marianna to the east and Brinkley (via U.S. Highway 49) to the north. Within the city, U.S. Highway 79B serves the central business district. Highway 302 is a north–south highway that begins at Madison Street in Clarendon and runs north to Highway 17 very near U.S. Highway 70.

The historic Clarendon Bridge over the White River has been replaced with a new alignment to the south of Clarendon by the Arkansas Department of Transportation (ARDOT). U.S. Highway 79 was slightly rerouted, with several miles of new bridges constructed over the White River, Cache River, Roc Roe Bayou, and several other waterways. The 1931 bridge, listed on the National Register of Historic Places (NRHP) and Historic American Engineering Record (HAER), has been subject to local restoration efforts as a bike and pedestrian path. The main span of the bridge was demolished using explosives on the morning of November 19, 2019.

Utilities
Wastewater is collected and conveyed to the Clarendon Wastewater Treatment Plant (WWTP) south of town. The facility uses a lagoon system, filters, and chlorination to produce treated effluent in accordance with the city's NPDES permit administrated by the Arkansas Department of Environmental Quality (ADEQ).

References

External links

Cities in Monroe County, Arkansas
Cities in Arkansas
County seats in Arkansas
Populated places established in 1859
1859 establishments in Arkansas